Névian is a commune in the Aude department in southern France.

Geography
The river Orbieu forms all of the commune's western border.

Population

See also
 Corbières AOC
 Communes of the Aude department

References

Communes of Aude
Aude communes articles needing translation from French Wikipedia